Kukhleh is a Negev Bedouin village in southern Israel. Located between the Bedouin towns of Hura and Kuseife, it falls under the jurisdiction of al-Kasom Regional Council.

See also
Arab localities in Israel
Bedouin in Israel

References

Al-Kasom Regional Council
Arab villages in Israel
Populated places in Southern District (Israel)